John Cairns (14 November 1902 – June 1965) was a Scottish professional football forward who played in the Football League for Charlton Athletic, Rochdale and Brentford.

Career statistics

References

1902 births
Footballers from Glasgow
Scottish footballers
English Football League players
Broxburn United F.C. players
Brentford F.C. players
Association football forwards
Kettering Town F.C. players
Charlton Athletic F.C. players
Leicester City F.C. players
Portsmouth F.C. players
Rochdale A.F.C. players
Canadian National Soccer League players
Scottish expatriate sportspeople in Canada
Scottish expatriate footballers
Expatriate soccer players in Canada
St Bernard's F.C. players
Dunfermline Athletic F.C. players
Margate F.C. players
Ramsgate F.C. players
1965 deaths